Ray Millington (born 15 May 1932) is a former Australian rules footballer with Fitzroy in the Victorian Football League (VFL).

He was recruited from the Eastern Suburbs club in the New South Wales competition.

Millington's career in Victoria was short-lived and by the start of the 1954 season he had returned to New South Wales and taken up rugby union with Randwick.

Notes

External links 

Living people
1932 births
Australian rules footballers from New South Wales
Fitzroy Football Club players